The Deadlys Awards were an annual celebration of Australian Aboriginal and Torres Strait Islander achievement in music, sport, entertainment and community.

Music
Outstanding Contribution to Aboriginal Music: Candy Williams
Music Video of the Year: Shakaya: "Sublime"
Most Promising New Talent: Shakaya
Country Artist of the Year: Jimmy Little
Male Artist of the Year: Archie Roach
Female Artist of the Year: Toni Janke
Album Release of the Year: Archie Roach: Sensual Being
Single Release of the Year: Shakaya: "Stop Calling Me"
Band of the Year: Shakaya

Sport
Female Sportsperson of the Year: Bo De La Cruz
Male Sportsperson of the Year: David Peachey
Most Promising New Talent in Sport: Jade North
Excellence in Football: Andrew McLeod

The arts
Female Actor of the Year: Everlyn Sampi
Male Actor of the Year: David Gulpilil
Excellence in Entertainment: Mary G
Excellence in Film or Theatrical Score: David Page and Steve Francis: Skin by Bangarra Dance Theatre

Community
Aboriginal Broadcaster of the Year: 4K1G

External links
Deadlys 2002 winners at Vibe

The Deadly Awards
2002 in Australian music
Indigenous Australia-related lists
2002 awards